The Aroostook County Historical and Art Museum is located at 109 Main Street, in the White Memorial Building, in Houlton, Maine.  The museum was founded in 1937, after the building, a handsome 1903 Colonial Revival house, was donated to the town by the White family.  The building was listed on the National Register of Historic Places in 1980. The Houlton Museum’s collections include artefacts and documents from Ricker Classical Institute and Ricker College; the photography collection of E. B. White; militaria and domestic objects; and art from the Houlton POW camp from WWII.

Collection

The Ricker Room
The Military Room
Sarah Houlton Kitchen
The Children's Room
Fancy Goods Room
Dining Room
Edward B. White Photo Collection
Camp Houlton & POW Camp
Col. Frank M. Hume

Architecture and history
The museum stands on the south side of Main Street, east of Houlton's downtown area, between Broadway and Kelleran Streets, and just east of Cary Library.  It is a handsome two-story Colonial Revival structure, designed by Kendal, Taylor and Stevens of Boston, Massachusetts, and built in 1903.  Its dominant feature is a two-story portico covering the center three bays of the five-bay facade.  It is supported by four Tuscan columns, with matching pilasters on the wall, and has an entablature topped by a denticulated cornice.  The main entrance has an elegant surround of pilasters supporting an entablatured lintel with consoles.  The interior has retained its original period woodwork, which is dignified yet restrained.

The house was built in 1903 by Mrs. Mary Louise (Woodbury) MacIntyre, whose father, Eben Woodbury, had built three successive houses on this property, all of which were destroyed by fire (the most recent in the town's devastating 1902 fire).  After her death in 1934, the house was purchased by Stella King White, who donated it to the town for use as a museum.
The building also houses the Houlton Chamber of Commerce in a small section on the first floor.

Early Years

The Houlton Historical and art Museum was founded by the late Hon. Ransford W. Shaw in 1937. Mr. Shaw was always interested in the history of Houlton. He served as President of the Museum from its founding until his death when he as succeeded by B. B. McIntire. 
Mr. Shaw said, in 1937: “When I made the suggestion to maintain a museum in Houlton, it received such a warm response that a public meeting was called at the court house where a corporation was formed to be known as the ‘Aroostook Historical and Art Museum’. After many trails and disappoints, on May 1, 1938, I rented a room in the Nickerson Block over Fishman's Store”.
Mr. and Mrs. S. L. White donated the stately colonial home, built by Mrs. Marion (Woodbury) MacIntyre after the great fire in 1902, in which to house the historical collections. The building is commonly known as the Donworth House, Mrs. MacIntyre's daughter, Mrs. Marion L. Donworth, having lived there several years after her mother's death.
Articles of historic interest were collected and by 1948 the museum had listed over 1200 articles. Arthur Brown became interested in the work and acted as curator until his health made it necessary for him to resign. Mrs. Edith Donald was elected to fill Mr. Brown's place. Mrs. Elizabeth Lakin, daughter of the Hon. R. W. Shaw, also has served as president of the organization. George W. Shaw, a son of R. W. Shaw, has contributed most generously to the upkeep of the building.
Mr. and Mrs. White, in purchasing and donating this fine old colonial home to the Town for use of the Museum, rendered a real service to the Community.

See also
National Register of Historic Places listings in Aroostook County, Maine
List of museums in Maine

References

External links
 Aroostook County Historical and Art Museum - Facebook site
 Houltonmuseum Museum website.

Houses on the National Register of Historic Places in Maine
Colonial Revival architecture in Maine
Houses completed in 1903
Buildings and structures in Houlton, Maine
Museums in Aroostook County, Maine
Houses in Aroostook County, Maine
History museums in Maine
National Register of Historic Places in Aroostook County, Maine